The 2014–15 Syrian Premier League season was the 44th since its establishment.
This season's league featured two stages. Stage one pitted two groups of nine teams and kicked off on 9 November 2014. The top three of each group advances to the Championship Playoff to determine the overall league champions. There was no relegation this season.

All matches were played in Damascus and Latakia due to security concerns.

First stage
Each team played each other twice; the top three advanced to the championship playoff, bottom two relegate.

Group A

Group B

Championship playoff

Each team plays each other once, the first place teams in the first stage get three points plus, the second place get two points and the third place get one point.

As a result, the teams started with the following points before the playoff: Al-Jaish 3, Al-Wahda 3 points, Al-Shorta 2, Al-Muhafaza 2,  Al-Majd 1 and Musfat Baniyas 1

References

Syrian Premier League seasons
1
Syria